Borneo tallow nut oil or sal nut oil is extracted from the fruit of species of genus Shorea, which is native to Borneo, Java, Malaya and the Philippines. The oil is extracted from the egg-shaped, winged fruit using traditional methods in rural areas. The nuts, once extracted from the shell, are placed in a rattan bag, which is placed between two hardwood boards, and then pressed by driving in wedges. The oil is composed of the following fatty acids:

References 

Vegetable oils